This is a list of German football transfers in the winter transfer window  2008–09  by club. Only transfers of the Bundesliga and 2. Bundesliga are included.

Bundesliga

FC Bayern Munich

In:

Out:

Note: Flags indicate national team as has been defined under FIFA eligibility rules. Players may hold more than one non-FIFA nationality.

SV Werder Bremen

In:

Out:

FC Schalke 04

In:

Out:

Hamburger SV

In:

Out:

VfL Wolfsburg

In:

Out:

VfB Stuttgart

In:

Out:

Bayer 04 Leverkusen

In:

Out:

Hannover 96

In:

Out:

Eintracht Frankfurt

In:

Out:

Hertha BSC Berlin

In:

Out:

Karlsruher SC

In:

Out:

VfL Bochum

In:

Out:

Borussia Dortmund

In:

Out:

FC Energie Cottbus

In:

Out:

Arminia Bielefeld

In:

Out:

Borussia Mönchengladbach

In:

Out:

TSG 1899 Hoffenheim

In:

Out:

1. FC Köln

In:

Out:

2. Bundesliga

1. FC Nürnberg

In:

Out:

FC Hansa Rostock

In:

Out:

MSV Duisburg

In:

Out:

1. FSV Mainz 05

In:

Out:

SC Freiburg

In:

Out:

SpVgg Greuther Fürth

In:

Out:

Alemannia Aachen

In:

Out:

SV Wehen Wiesbaden

In:

Out:

FC St. Pauli

In:

Out:

TuS Koblenz

In:

Out:

TSV 1860 München

In:

Out:

VfL Osnabrück

In:

Out:

1. FC Kaiserslautern

In:

Out:

FC Augsburg

In:

Out:

Rot Weiss Ahlen

In:

Out:

Rot-Weiß Oberhausen

In:

Out:

FC Ingolstadt 04

In:

Out:

FSV Frankfurt

In:

Out:

See also
 2008–09 Bundesliga
 2008–09 2. Bundesliga
 List of German football transfers summer 2008

References

External links
 Official site of the DFB 
 kicker.de 
 Official site of the Bundesliga 
 Official site of the Bundesliga 

Trans
Germany
2008-09